Lycée Descartes de Montigny le Bretonneux is a senior high school located in the Sourderie area, in Montigny-le-Bretonneux, Yvelines, France, in the Paris metropolitan area.

It opened in 1980 with 60 students, and at the time it was integrated with the Collège Hélène Boucher junior high school. As of autumn 2014 it had 940 students.

References

External links
  Lycée Descartes de Montigny le Bretonneux

1980 establishments in France
Educational institutions established in 1980
Schools in Saint-Quentin-en-Yvelines
Lycées in Yvelines